Daring was a steamboat constructed in Tacoma, Washington in 1909. The vessel was later renamed Clinton and used as a tugboat. Clinton was rammed and sunk in 1922 in Burrard Inlet.

Construction
Daring was built at Tacoma in 1909 by the shipyard of Crawford and Reid for Matthew McDowell's Seattle-Tacoma-East Pass route.

Later operations
From 1916 to 1918, Daring was operated as a tug by Chesley Tug Co. out of Seattle, and was then sold to Pacific Great Eastern Railway, Victoria, British Columbia and renamed Clinton. On 15 January 1922 the tug Clinton was rammed and sunk by Canadian Pacific Railway ferry  in Burrard Inlet.

Notes

Steamboats of Washington (state)
Propeller-driven steamboats of Washington (state)
Ships built by Crawford and Reid
1909 ships